Accentuate the Positive is an album of songs from the 1940s, recorded in 2004 by singer Al Jarreau. In 2005 the album received a Grammy Award nomination for Best Jazz Vocal Album.

Track listing 
 "Cold Duck" (Eddie Harris, Jarreau) - 3:46
 "The Nearness of You" (Hoagy Carmichael, Ned Washington) - 3:43
 "I'm Beginning to See the Light" (Duke Ellington, Don George, Johnny Hodges, Harry James) - 4:04
 "My Foolish Heart" (Ned Washington, Victor Young) - 5:32
 "Midnight Sun" (Lionel Hampton, Sonny Burke, Johnny Mercer) - 6:01
 "Accentuate the Positive" (Harold Arlen, Johnny Mercer) - 4:03
 "Betty Bebop's Song" (Jarreau, Freddie Ravel) - 4:16
 "Waltz for Debby" (Bill Evans, Gene Lees) - 4:44
 "Groovin' High" (Dizzy Gillespie, Jarreau) - 4:11
 "Lotus" (Don Grolnick, Jarreau) - 5:11
 "Scootcha Booty" (Russell Ferrante, Jarreau) - 4:26

Personnel 
 Al Jarreau – vocals
 Larry Williams – keyboards and arrangements (2, 4, 5–10)
 Larry Goldings – Hammond B3 organ (3)
 Russell Ferrante – acoustic piano (11)
 Anthony Wilson – guitars
 Christian McBride – bass (1, 2, 5, 6, 8, 9, 10)
 Dave Carpenter – bass (4, 7, 11)
 Mark Simmons – drums (1, 5, 6)
 Peter Erskine – drums (2, 3, 4, 7–11)
 Luis Conte – percussion (1, 4, 6, 10)
 Keith Anderson – tenor saxophone (1, 6)
 Tollak Ollestad – harmonica (5)

Production 
 Producer – Tommy LiPuma
 Executive Producer and Management – Bill Darlington
 Production Coordinator – Shari Sutcliffe
 Recorded and Mixed by Al Schmitt at Capitol Studios (Hollywood, CA).
 Assistant Engineer – Steve Genewick
 Mastered by Doug Sax and Robert Hadley at The Mastering Lab (Hollywood, CA).
 Art Direction – Hollis King
 Design – Rika Ichiki
 Photography – Rocky Schenck
 Liner Notes – Al Jarreau

References 

Al Jarreau albums
2004 albums
Albums produced by Tommy LiPuma
GRP Records albums

Albums recorded at Capitol Studios